The Death Card is the debut album from American metalcore band Sworn In. It was released by Razor & Tie Recordings on 20 August 2013.

The record's release was preceded by a video for the first single, "Snake Eyes."

Critical reception
AllMusic called the album "characterized by bleak lyrics, screamy vocals, and a straightforward musical backdrop of by-the-book metal-influenced hardcore."

Track listing

Personnel
Sworn In
 Tyler Dennen – vocals
 Eugene Kamlyuk – guitar
 Zakary Gibson – guitar
 Sean Banks – bass
 Chris George – drums

Additional
 Forefathers – album Art

Charts
Album

References

External links
Review on MetalInjection
New Noise Magazine

2013 debut albums
Sworn In (band) albums
Razor & Tie albums